Bandera Independent School District is a public school district based in Bandera, Texas (USA).   In addition to Bandera, the district also serves the communities of Lakehills, Bandera Falls, Pipe Creek, and Tarpley.

Finances
As of the 2010-2011 school year, the appraised valuation of property in the district was $1,291,941,000. The maintenance tax rate was $0.104 and the bond tax rate was $0.015 per $100 of appraised valuation.

Academic achievement
In 2011, the school district was rated "recognized" by the Texas Education Agency.

Schools
In the 2012-2013 school year, the district had students in four schools. 
Bandera High School (Grades 9-12)
2001-02 National Blue Ribbon School
Bandera Middle (Grades 6-8)
Alkek Elementary (Grades EE-5)
Hill Country Elementary (Grades EE-5)- Located in Bandera Falls

See also

List of school districts in Texas

References

External links 
 

School districts in Bandera County, Texas